The  (TDM) is a corps of the French Army that includes several specialities: infantry, artillery, armoured, airborne, engineering, and transmissions (Signals). 
Despite its name, it forms part of the Army, not the Navy. Intended for amphibious and overseas operations, the Troupes de marine have been, and still are, in all the fights of the French army. It has gradually become professionalized since 1970.

History 

Ancien Régime

Origin 
These companies were used to embark on royal naval ships to serve the naval artillery and participate in the boarding of enemy ships. These companies were also in charge of guarding the various sea ports. Since then the anchor has been with the Troupes as the official symbol because of the former links to the Royal Navy.

Decimated along with the rest of the Marines during the Seven Years' War, these troops were transferred to the French Army under the Choiseul ministries, and after their emancipation at the end of 1760, they retained a large number of officers issued from the Ministère de la Guerre, which would reproduce and compensate for the losses endured assisting the colonies during the American Revolutionary War. An evolution in the mentality of the troops and an increasingly pronounced separation between the marines and their officers followed. A tentative close-up merger was attempted by two naval ship corps and their troops in 1786 with the companies of naval gunners assigned to ships of the Navy; however, the experiment came to little conclusion.

Ordinary Sea Companies and Troupes de la marine (1622–1673) 
 
They wore an off-white/grey uniform with blue facings .

The 1670s saw significant changes in the organisation of the new corps, administered by Ministers Colbert and François-Michel le Tellier, Marquis de Louvois, respectively Naval State Secretary and the Secretary of State of War. The four regiments of the la marine were transferred from the secretariat of La Marine to that of the secretariat of La Guerre. The regiments were no longer directly part of the French Navy although the designation  was retained.

The Marine Royale was a substantial force in 1671, consisting of 196 naval vessels. Colbert decided to create 100 companies of "guardian-soldiers" intended to form part of the crews of the larger naval vessels. However, these men were redirected towards the French Army by Louvois in 1673. Starting from this date, senior naval and marine officers were obliged to separately recruit crews and marines for each ship. Using a system of «levées» (selective conscription) in the various sea ports, similar to the « marine press », the naval and marine officers were able to man their ships. However, the system reached its limitations quickly. The recruits often lacked discipline and experience, and were discharged or deserted following their first voyage, wasting months of training. Until 1682 there was a serious shortage of experienced sailors and soldiers in the French Navy.

Free Marine Companies and Marine Artillery Corps (1690–1761) 

  (Free Marine Companies) created in 1690. Each company was tasked to guard a military harbor and its immediate coastline. Beginning in 1695, the Companies were organized in battalions around the major harbors (Brest, Rochefort, Toulon). The Marine Companies and Battalions were dissolved in 1761.
  (Marine Artillery Corps), created in 1692 to oversee the training and use of coastal artillery. The Corps was disbanded in 1761.

Royal Marine Corps (1769–1786) 
The infantry and marine artillery units were briefly merged into a single marine corps in 1769. Some colonial units were created at the same time, organized along the same lines of artillery and infantry units.
  (Royal Marine Artillery and Infantry Corps), created in 1769. The Corps was organized in eight regiments, each centered on a harbor: (Bayonne, Bordeaux, Brest, Le Havre, Marseille, Rochefort, Saint-Malo and Toulon). The corps was broken down in 1774, in line with Antoine de Sartine's reform of the navy.
  ("Royal Marine Infantry Corps), created in 1774 with the infantry units of the Royal Marine Corps, organized in three divisions centered on the only three military harbors remaining: Brest, Rochefort and Toulon. The corps was disbanded in 1786.
  (Marine Artillery), created in 1774 with the artillery units of the Royal Marine Corps, organized in three divisions centered on the same three military harbors: Brest, Rochefort and Toulon. The Marine Artillerymen were tasked to serve aboard Navy ships as well as manning the coastal batteries. The commanding officers of the Marine Artillery were naval officers. The corps was dispanded in 1786.
 Colonial Regiments
 "Cap", created 1766, became the 106th Infantry Regiment
 "Pondichéry", set up 1772, became the 107th Infantry Regiment
 "Martinique et Guadeloupe", created 1772, became the 109th Infantry Regiment
 "Port-au-Prince", created 1773, became 110th Infantry Regiment

Revolution and First French Empire (1786–1816) 
After 1786, the Marine units were often reduced to artillery units, except for some short-lived infantry regiments (1792–1794). 
  (Royal Sailors-Gunners Corps), created on 1 January 1786. The  was an early attempt to use sailors for duties previously done by marines – soldiers specializing in naval and amphibious combat. This naval artillery corps was suppressed in 1792 and its duties transferred to a new marine unit.
  (Marine Artillery and Infantry Corps), created in 1792. The Corps had four infantry regiments, two artillery regiments, two engineer companies and two training companies. The infantry units were transferred to the Army in 1794.
  (Marine Artillery Corps), created in 1794 from the artillery units of the Artillery and Infantry Corps. It was organized in seven half-brigades and re-organized in four regiments in 1803. The Corps gained the title Impérial at Napoléon I's coronation (1804) and Royal at Louis XVIII's return (1814 and 1815).

These units fought for France during the French Revolutionary Wars and in all the Napoleonic Wars.

19th century 
The colonial expansion of the 19th century saw the extensive use of French sailors and marines serving together in Southeast Asia, the Pacific, and West Africa. The  were tasked with insuring the French presence in its Asian, African, and American colonies.

The revolutionary period saw a definite division in 1792 between the reconstituted  and the ships of the navy. Following the disbandment of the Imperial Guard, under the Restoration, separate marine artillery and marine infantry units were created as part of a reorganization between 1818 and 1822. These two corps were popularly known as « bigors » and « marsouins » respectively. Starting in 1831, these two arms ceased to serve on board naval ships and were exclusively armed with regular army equipment and weapons. Their role was now to serve on land in the new French colonial territories, as well as defending the large naval ports and bases in France itself.

The diverse colonial or exterior operations administered by the July Monarchy, essentially conducted by the Marines and their troops, led to the rehabilitation and the increase of the latter in 1846. The revolution of 1848 led to a draconian reduction in size. The Crimean War saw them, along with the equipment of naval vessels of the fleet, illustrating their capability during the Siege of Sevastopol while aiding the heavy artillery pieces ( to constitute a siege artillery ) to disembark from the naval vessels under the orders of Admiral Charles Rigault de Genouilly.

Honored since 1855, with the return of their staff of 1846, the marines demonstrated their capability during the expeditions of the Second French Empire.

In 1870, marine artillery and infantry were for the first time regrouped in a grand unit: Blue Division of general Élie de Vassoigne, named after the blue uniforms worn by the soldiers to differentiate them from the line troops. Following the Franco-Prussian War, the marines participated to the construction of the second colonial empire of France.

Marine Infantry and Marine Artillery Regiments (1816–1900) 
The 21 February 1816, royal ordinance of Louis XVIII re-establishing  authorized two regiments. This was increased to three regiments in 1838 and four in 1854. The 1st Regiment was located in Cherbourg, the 2nd in Brest, the 3rd in Rochefort and the 4th in Toulon. In 1890,  was increased to eight regiments. , created in 1793, was formed into a single regiment in 1814. A second was added on 8 July 1893. Battles fought in this era included Bomarsund (1854) in the Baltic, Sea of Azoff and the Crimea (1855-56), Ki Hoa in China (1860), and the Battle of Puebla in Mexico (1863). Their most famous battle was Bazeilles (1870) in the Franco-Prussian War.

The  fought in the Sino-French War (August 1884 to April 1885) and during the period of undeclared hostilities in Tonkin (northern Vietnam) that preceded it. Between June 1883 and April 1886 the Tonkin Expeditionary Corps included several marine infantry battalions and marine artillery batteries. These units saw service in the Sơn Tây Campaign (December 1883), the Bắc Ninh Campaign (March 1884), the Capture of Hưng Hóa (April 1884), the Bắc Lệ ambush (June 1884), the Keelung Campaign (October 1884 to June 1885), the Battle of Yu Oc (November 1884), the Battle of Núi Bop (January 1885), the Lạng Sơn Campaign (February 1885) and the Pescadores Campaign (March 1885). In March 1885 the two marine infantry battalions in Lieutenant-Colonel Ange-Laurent Giovanninelli's 1st Brigade suffered heavy casualties storming the Chinese trenches at the Battle of Hòa Mộc. The French victory at Hòa Mộc relieved the Siege of Tuyên Quang, and was commemorated thereafter in an annual ceremony at Tuyên Quang in which a soldier of the French Foreign Legion (representing the besieged garrison) and a marine infantryman (representing the relief column) solemnly presented arms on the anniversary of the relief of the beleaguered French post.

The French Navy itself, due to the trouble it was having in obtaining naval infantry detachments from the Ministry of the Navy, established the Fusiliers Marins in 1856. The  were initially composed of sailors, senior rates and naval officers who undertook special infantry training to form the "marine" detachments aboard ships and conduct small scale landings. Unlike their anglophone contemporaries, they are graded by naval rates rather than adopting army ranks.

Transformation to Troupes Coloniales 

In 1890 the Ministry of Colonies was separated from that of the Ministère de la Marine.

The  were composed of two distinct corps. One was the colonial forces in metropolitan France, composed of Europeans who had voluntarily enlisted for successive service engagements of five years duration. These regulars (as opposed to conscripts) were assigned in small contingents to undertake tours of duty in the various French colonies outside North Africa. The proportion of European to "native" colonial troops were progressively reduced as additional locally recruited units were created during the late 19th and earlier 20th centuries.

One problem of this system was the differences between the training and equipment required for colonial and European warfare. Service conditions in turn would differ between the various colonial territories in Africa and South East Asia. The two types of colonial troupes were however successfully employed in World War I and World War II, as well as the Indochina War and the Algerian War.

The Construction Service of the marine artillery (which designed and engineered the naval artillery guns in the metropolitan arsenals), became an integral part of the colonial artillery following the reorganisation of 1900. In 1909 those colonial artillery officers who specialised in artillery design and manufacture work were transferred into the newly created "Engineers of Naval Artillery"; a newly created corps of the French Navy which subsequently merged with the Naval Engineer Corps (responsible for the construction of naval ships) during the Second World War.

In 1905, the strength of the  stationed in (the 19 military districts of metropolitan) France was marked at 2,123 officers and 26,581 other ranks. The strength maintained in the colonies amounts to 1,743 officers, 21,516 European troops and 47,868 native soldiers.

Troupes Coloniales (1900–1958) 
By the time the Troupes were transferred to the Army the unit names changed from "Marine" to "Colonial" while the  remained part of the French Navy. The  were still used in occasional amphibious landings but this was because of the ready availability of units normally based near naval embarkation ports or in colonial garrisons. In the World War I Gallipoli campaign in the Dardanelles, the Corps expéditionnaire d'Orient was more than two-thirds  including the 4th, 6th, 7th and 8th Colonial Infantry Regiments and Colonial Artillery. The  were however far more likely to see action in African or Asian land campaigns or, during both World Wars, in France itself.

In World War II, one Colonial unit did have "Marine" in its title – The Bataillon d'Infanterie de Marine du Pacifique (BIMP). Both these divisions also landed in southern France in the follow-on echelons of Operation Dragoon. The French wanted the United States to transport these two divisions to the Pacific to fight against the Japanese and later retake French Indochina, but transport was a problem.

The  distinguished themselves in both World Wars. The most decorated regimental colors of the French Armed Forces are those of the Colonial Infantry Regiment of Morocco (RICM) and the regimental colors of the 2nd Marine Infantry Regiment 2e RIMa. After 1945 the decolonization wars involved the colonial troops in Indochina, Algeria, and Madagascar. Following 1962, operations in Africa were undertaken by the again renamed  and the Légion étrangère which were the only units mainly or entirely composed of "engaged" (non-conscript) soldiers. This was also the case in Tchad and in Lebanon and the former Yugoslavia before metropolitan troops started also to recruit volunteer soldiers. The cessation of obligatory military service after 2001 permitted the deployment of the remainder of the French Army in overseas operations.

End of Troupes Coloniales and recreation of Troupes de Marine

Troupes de Marine (1958– present) 

They became a major component in France's . It was named after and carried the insignia of the 9th Colonial Infantry Division (9e DIC) that had performed a successful amphibious assault on Elba in World War II. This division was the amphibious component of the Force d'Intervention, which was renamed the Force d'Action Rapide (FAR) in 1983.

The  are one of the "" (corps) of the French Army, which includes specialties associated with other corps (artillery, cavalry, signals, armour, paratroopers) but with overseas deployment as a specialisation.

Gallery

Nicknames 

Composition 
The  include:
 Infanterie de Marine
 Infantry (abbreviation: -IMa)
 Light Cavalry (abbreviation: -IMa). The cavalry units of  use the military ranks of the infantry, unlike the rest of the Army cavalry. In military slang, they don't refer to themselves as cavalry but as "armored colonials".
 Airborne Infantry (abbreviation: -PIMa)
 
 Artillery (abbreviation: -AMa)
 Recently, an engineer corps regiment became the first engineer regiment to inherit from Marine traditions. It's the 6ème Régiment du Génie.

Uniform 
The modern  uniform is the same as for other units of the French Army (light beige, plain green or woodland or desert camouflage according to circumstances). Distinctive features are a gold metal fouled anchor badge on a dark blue beret (Marine paratroopers wear red berets and their badge is a composite of the gold metal anchor and the silver wing of airborne units). This is worn either on the beret or embroidered on the front of the kepi.

The modern full dress includes a dark blue kepi, yellow fringed epaulettes (official colour name is daffodil) and a navy blue cravat (scarf worn around the neck). A red waist sash is also sometimes worn by certain units with a history of colonial service in Africa and Indo-China.

Historically, the uniform consisted of a blue kepi with red piping, double breasted navy blue tunic, lighter blue trousers, and yellow epaulettes. Worn by all ranks until 1914, the blue uniform was reissued for regular personnel in 1930 and is still worn by bandsmen. This traditional uniform gave the nickname of "the Blue Division" to the  units involved in the 1870 Franco-Prussian War. The pith helmet was worn overseas during the colonial period, with blue, khaki or white uniforms according to circumstances.

Gallery

Kepi and traditional epaulettes 
The modern kepi is presented to new recruits in a solemn ceremony. It is worn by officers and non-commissioned officers when another headdress is not prescribed. The kepi is entirely dark blue – a very dark blue, often mistaken for black – with a red (privates and corporals) or gold (non-commissioned officers and officers) trimming. All kepis display the anchor insignia of the Marines. When not being worn the kepi is expected to be positioned so that the anchor is always visible.

The "traditional" epaulettes used by the TdM are gold for officers and NCOs and wool of "daffodil" yellow for other ranks. This colour and pattern is derived from the historic epaulettes of the Metropolitan light infantry.

Golden Spurs 
The officers of marine "mounted" units (that is to say those formerly using horses, or currently armored vehicles) have the privilege of wearing gold spurs for certain occasions. This differs from the usual French cavalry practice of wearing silver spurs. Tradition has it that Queen Victoria of the United Kingdom requested this distinction for the marine troops from Emperor Napoleon III to honor the branch after the Battle of Balaclava in the Crimea (1854) where marine infantry saved British troops from destruction.

Sword 
The officers and senior non-commissioned-officer can wear, in special circumstances, a sword as a part of their dress uniform. This sword has a straight-edge blade, in contrast to other Army Corps' curved sabers and thus similar to those of the Royal Marines and the rest of the British Armed Forces. Since the Second World War, the sword is very rarely used.

Red Beret 

The armored, artillery and infantry regiments of the Marines wear dark blue berets with golden anchor insignia. The parachute regiments of the Marines (1e RPIMa, 2e RPIMa, 3e RPIMa, 8e RPIMa) wear a red beret with anchor and wing insignia, except the 1e RPIMa, a Special Forces regiment, where soldiers wear a purple beret.

The red beret was first introduced to the Free French Paratroopers of the SAS in August 1944, at the 2e RCP during a parade on 11 November 1944, this regiment for a first time dressed this beret with the insignia of the SAS. However, these paratroopers then belonged to the Air Force. In Indochina, the Infantry Metropolitan SAS Demi-Brigade retained the practice, which was readopted by the 1st SAS Parachute Demi-Brigade in 1948. The red beret, which was officially introduced as the standard uniform headdress on all Paratroopers in Indochina in 1952 by Général Jean de Lattre de Tassigny (except for the Legion), became the norm for all airborne contingents of the French Army in 1957, with legionnaires paratroopers retaining their traditional green beret, and the 1e RPIMa which transitioned to a purple beret in 2015.

Marsouins, Bigors and Biffins 
The nickname used by Marsouins and Bigors for the other branches of the French Army is biffins (slang for ragmen). The name originated in the nineteenth century when sailors of the Fleet and Marine Infantry and Artillerymen, proud of their own smart appearance, accused the soldiers of the Army of being slovenly by comparison. The Legion is excused this nickname, probably reflecting a special relation between Marsouins and legionnaires.

Traditions 
The Feast of the Marines: in the name of God, long live the colonials! This expression is believed to have originated with the famous missionary Charles de Foucauld who, when rescued by colonial troops, exclaimed "In the name of God, the great colonials!". Annual ceremonies celebrating the marine troops take place on 31 August and 1 September – the anniversary of the Blue Division. On 31 August detachments of all marine units parade at Fréjus where the Museum of Marine Troops is located. On 1 September veterans hold a ceremony at Bazeilles in Ardennes.

The anchor of gold 
As a naval symbol since ancient times, the anchor appeared on the uniforms of French sailors from the late eighteenth century.
 1772: a royal ordinance provides for the port anchor badge on the uniforms of the French Royal Navy, including the Marine Regiment.
 1900: the anchor is carried by the Colonial Infantry with their transfer to the Army.
 1916: the Colonial Troops adopt the badge of an anchor over a flaming grenade (the latter being a traditional distinction of elite troops).
 1919: All officers of the Colonial Troops adopt a gold anchor on their kepis.
 1920: an anchor entwined with a cable becomes the common badge of Colonial Troops.
 1933: Colonial Artillery gunners no longer wear the grenade insignia.
 1935: the anchor insignia appears alone on the armbands worn by Staff officers of the Colonial Troops.
 1939: the anchor no longer to be worn with an intwined cable.
 1945: the anchor officially sanctioned to be worn on all the attributes (including headgear and uniforms) of the Colonial Troops.
 1953: approval of a "traditional" anchor design for the CT.
 1962: introduction of the TDM beret, regulated by the Corps, with the gold anchor badge as the DUI (Distinctive unit insignia). 
 1985: "traditional" anchor now permitted to be carried on pennants and guidons as a badge.

Location 
The particular role of this branch of the French Army is to consolidate various specialties: infantry, artillery, cavalry (armored), parachute forces, signals and engineers. These specialties, which are consolidated in the  branch, form separate arms in the rest of the Army.

Current units 
The État-major spécialisé pour l'outre-mer et l'étranger (EMSOME), the Specialized Staff for Overseas and Foreign, functions as the Troupes de marine headquarters, and also directs Foreign Legion forces overseas. The General commanding the EMSOME is nicknamed the "Father of the Marine Corps" (le Père de l'Arme des TDM).
 Régiment de Marche du Tchad in Meyenheim (mechanized infantry)
 Régiment d'infanterie-chars de marine (RICM) in Poitiers (light armoured)
 1er Régiment de Parachutistes d'Infanterie de Marine (1er RPIMa) in Bayonne (airborne/special forces)
 3e Régiment de Parachutistes d'Infanterie de Marine} (3e RPIMa) in Carcassonne (airborne infantry)
 8e Régiment de Parachutistes d'Infanterie de Marine (8e RPIMa) in Castres (airborne infantry)
 1er Régiment d'Infanterie de Marine (1er RIMa) in Angoulême (light armoured)
  (2e RIMa) in Le Mans (infantry)
  (3e RIMa) in Vannes (infantry)
  (21e RIMa) in Fréjus (infantry)
  (1er RAMa) in Châlons-en-Champagne (artillery)
  (3e RAMa) in Canjuers (artillery)
  (11e RAMa) in Saint-Aubin-du-Cormier (artillery)
 6e Régiment du Génie – (Marine Sappers) in Angers (engineers)
 Overseas:
  (2e RPIMa) in Pierrefonds (Réunion) (airborne infantry)
  (5e RIAOM) in Djibouti
  (6e BIMa) in Libreville (Gabon) (infantry)
  (9e RIMa) in Cayenne (French Guiana) (infantry)
  (33e RIMa) in Fort-de-France (Martinique) (infantry)
  –  (RIMaP-NC) in Nouméa New Caledonia (infantry)
  (RIMaP-P) in Papeete (infantry)

Dissolved units with their traditions trusted to other units

Other Parachute Marine units dissolved 

 Battalions and Colonial Parachute Groups (B.C.C.P, G.C.C.P & B.P.C)
  (5e RPIMa)
  (6e RPIMa)
  (7e RPIMa)

Anthem 
(traditional)

This song is sung at a brisk pace to marching music
 In battle or storm,
 The chorus of male songs, (repeat)
 Our soul always ready to danger,
 Brave and lightning guns.
 Men of iron that nothing weary
 We look death in the face,
 In the roaring storm or rough fight. Forward!
 To make a soldier of Marine
 You need in the chest
 The heart of a sailor and that of a soldier.
 Often in the torrid zone,
 The tooth tiger or lion
 Fever or ball homicide
 Just decimate our battalions.
 So to the motherland,
 We see, contorted with agony,
 In a supreme effort to turn our front. Forward!
 And we regret unanimous
 Dear France, O sublime country!
 This is for you to have one life to give.

 Be proud soldier in the Navy,
 Love thy victory bugles
 And your face illuminated by burnished,
 The brilliance of great deeds.
 From the Bosphorus to Martinique,
 From Senegal to the Pacific
 We see your flag colors shine. Forward!
 The glory took you under his wing,
 For the honor always faithful,

 You die in battle or you come back victorious.
 In every battle in the Crimea,
 We too have taken part
 De Malakoff under fire,
 We were climbing the walls.
 At the sight of our uniforms,
 That the fire or sword deforms,
 The enemy turned pale, stepped back many times. Forward!
 And on our foreheads that shines,
 We can see the triple crown
 The laurels of Podor, of Inkerman and Alma.
 When Prussia inundating France,
 About Us unleashed its fury,
 At his balls as his spears
 We have opposed our hearts.
 And when the battle roared,
 Our forehead, wounded by shrapnel,
 Bloody, but untamed, defied the winners. Forward!
 A Bazeilles The Cluze and Neuville,
 When fighting against one hundred thousand,
 The success betrays us but we kept the honor.

 Constantly ready for any fight;
 Valiant soldiers of our major ports,
 No nothing can kill you
 Who do you count your dead point
 You reduce Chinese, Kanaka,
 In Madagascar you, Annam and Tonkin. Forward!
 Also under the sky its dome
 Joined still halo
 Son-Tay and Nouméa, Tamatave and Beijing

 A day will come, dear hope,
 Where the ardent call of bugles,
 Will rise to our France
 Avengers ... and we will.
 So for us, oh what a feast!
 We will give younger sisters,
 For the victories of Jena, Auerstadt, Stettin. Forward!
 Yes we love the holy wars
 For the blood of heroes, our fathers,
 In our blood on fire, do not flow in vain

Values of the Marine Troops 
Formed initially to be deployed for service on France's overseas territories to maintain French interests, the marine troops have acquired a culture of openness. In addition, foreign missions have required the weapon it covers areas of varied specialties (combat infantry and armor, fire support, communications ...) the exercise of which, today, reinforces a long history of professionalism.

Transcending the concept of mastering military equipment and technologies, the marine troops unite around a single symbol, the traditional golden anchor, that for those who serve marks a unique style whose main features are:
 A brotherhood of gun mindset maintained by simple and warm human relationships between comrades in arms;
 An ability to adapt to the most unusual situations, a true lifestyle product of history and operational experience repeated;
 A "military humanism", perpetuating culture of others including the ability to make contacts with the most diverse populations and to gain their trust. This military humanism embodied by the tradition of multiculturalism are today carried on by the Specialised Headquarters for Overseas and Foreign Units (État-major spécialisé pour l’outre-mer et l’étranger).

These high values of identity give meaning to the commitment of the Marsouin and Bigord and always based natural vocation of the marine troops serving both in the French overseas territories and abroad.

See also 

 Marine corps
 Tirailleur
 French colonial flags
 French colonial empire
 List of French possessions and colonies
 Moroccan Division

Sources 
 Serge Saint-Michel & Rene Le Honzec, 
 CEHD, Paris, Lavauzelle, 2001, 444 p., 
 , Paris, H. Charles-Lavauzelle, 1903.
 Louis Beausza, Paris, L. Fournier et cie., 1939.
 Marcel Vigneras, Rearming the French, Office of the Chief of Military History, Dept. of the Army, 1957
 John C. Cornelius, Richard J. Sommers, Michael Winey, The Military Forces of France, Washington, GPO, 1977.

References

External links 
 
 Unofficial site (managed by the national federation of veterans of oversea and marine troops)
  
  

French Army
Arms of the French Army
Military units and formations established in 1622
1622 establishments in France